William Carran  (3 August 1898 – 1 October 1960) was a New Zealand policeman and assistant commissioner of police. He was born on 3 August 1898.

In the 1958 Queen's Birthday Honours, Carran was appointed a Member of the Order of the British Empire.

References

1898 births
1960 deaths
New Zealand police officers
Te Āti Awa people
New Zealand Māori public servants
New Zealand Members of the Order of the British Empire